KB Trepça is a professional basketball club based in Mitrovicë, Kosovo. The club competes in the Kosovo Basketball Superleague, Balkan basketball International League and Kosovo Cup. KB Trepca is one of the most successful clubs in Kosovo, KB Trepca has won 4 National Championships and 6 Kosova Basketball Cups

Arena

The club plays in the sport center Salla e sporteve "Minatori", in the center of Mitrovica, with a capacity for around 3,000 spectators.

European record

Roster

Average Height: 195.2 cm (6′5″) Average Age: 26.9

Depth chart

Honors and titles

Domestic
Kosovo Superleague
Winners (4): 1993, 2000, 2001, 2012
Runners-up (5):  1994, 2002, 2007, 2010, 2022

Kosovo Cup
Winners (6): 1993, 2000, 2004, 2012, 2022, 2023
Runners-up (2): 2005, 2010

Liga Unike Supercup
Winners (1): 2022

Notable players

 John Gardiner
 Narcis Begovac
 Senad Delić
 Jasenko Elezović
 Nedžad Spahić
 Edin Nurkanović
 Dinko Pelto
 Tarik Varaga
 Mladen Varaga
 Marko Zorz
 Charles Manga
 Igor Miličić
 Davor Halbauer
 Davor Kurilić
 Jure Lonzančić
 Besim Braha
 Drilon Hajrizi
 Esat Ibrahimi
 Artan Mehmeti
 Eroll Pepiqi
 Edmon Raqa
 Vigan Raqa
 Ilir Selmani
 Bekim Syla
 Besnik Tupella
 Naim Haxha
 Fikret Handžić
 Ylber Jusufi
 Muhamed Thaçi
 Dime Tasovski
 Alex Mpoyo
 Amir Delalić
 Melvis Haskić
 Jan Orfila
 Álvaro Calvo
 Haashim Simmons
 Ryan Burgart
 Frank Butler
 Darren Fenn
 Dennis Mims
 Julius Teal
 Kevin Guyden
 Jaleel Nelson
 Ken Brown
 Rodney Purvis
 Will Daniels

Coaching history

 2006/08  Naim Hajrizi
 2008/09  Aleksandar Sarkanj
 2010/11  Saša Katalinić
 2011/12  Ilir Selmani
 2012/13  Panče Milevski
 2013/14  Israel Martín
 2014/15  Izet Tahiri
 2015/16  Neven Plantak
 2017/19  Ilir Selmani
 2021/22  Lubomir Minchev
 2022/2023  Aleksandar Jončevski
 2023/present  Engin Gençoglu

References

External links
KB Trepça - Kosovo Basketball Federation
KB Trepça - Profile Eurobasket.com
KB Trepça - BIBL (Balkan International Basketball League)
KB Trepça Official Facebook
KB Trepça Official Fanpage Facebook
 

Basketball teams in Kosovo
Sport in Mitrovica, Kosovo
Basketball teams in Yugoslavia
1972 establishments in Yugoslavia
Basketball teams established in 1972